Eurotium herbariorum is a species of fungus belonging to the family Trichocomaceae.

It has cosmopolitan distribution.

References

Trichocomaceae